Austin Eugene Renforth is a United States Marine Corps major general who serves as the Commanding General of the Marine Air-Ground Task Force Training Command and Marine Corps Air Ground Combat Center Twentynine Palms. He also served as the acting Chief of Staff of the North American Aerospace Defense Command and United States Northern Command. Renforth enlisted in the United States Navy in 1982 and was appointed to the United States Naval Academy in 1984. He graduated from the Naval Academy with a B.S. degree in mathematics in 1988.

References

External links

Year of birth missing (living people)
Living people
Place of birth missing (living people)
United States Navy sailors
United States Naval Academy alumni
United States Marine Corps generals